Carstensen is a patronymic surname. Notable people with the surname include:

Andreas Riis Carstensen (1844–1906), Danish painter
Bianca Carstensen (born 1975), Danish rower
Carl Carstensen (1863–1940), Danish Scouting pioneer
Christian Carstensen (born 1973), German politician
Dee Carstensen (born 1956), American singer-songwriter and harpist
Ebba Carstensen (1885–1967), Danish painter
Fritze Carstensen (1925–2005), Danish swimmer
Georg Carstensen (1812–1857), Danish military officer and developer of Tivoli Gardens
Hans Jacob Carstensen (born 1965), Danish businessman
Henrik Carstensen (1753–1835), Norwegian businessman, timber merchant and shipowner
Jacob Carstensen (born 1978), Danish swimmer
Johannes Carstensen (1924—2010), Danish painter
Kira Carstensen, documentary filmmaker
Laura L. Carstensen, American psychologist
Margit Carstensen (born 1940), German actress
Peter Harry Carstensen (born 1947), German politician
Povl Erik Carstensen (born 1960), Danish comedian, actor and jazz double bassist
Stian Carstensen (born 1971), Norwegian musician
Tage Carstensen, Danish Scouting pioneer

Danish-language surnames
Patronymic surnames